The 2023 Texas Tech Red Raiders football team will represent Texas Tech University in the 2023 NCAA Division I FBS football season. The Red Raiders will play their home games at Jones AT&T Stadium and Cody Campbell Field in Lubbock, Texas, and will compete in the Big 12 Conference. They will be led by second-year head coach Joey McGuire.

Previous season
The 2022 team finished the regular season with a record of 7–5, 5–4 in Big 12 play, finishing fourth in the conference; it was the Red Raiders' first winning conference record since 2009. 2022 also marked the first time in program history that Texas Tech defeated Texas and Oklahoma in the same season. The Red Raiders were invited to the Texas Bowl, defeating Ole Miss 42–25 to finish the season with an overall record of 8–5.

Offseason

Coaching changes
On January 10, passing game coordinator and receivers coach Emmett Jones left Texas Tech to take the same position with the Oklahoma Sooners. The following day, January 11, Baylor running backs coach Justin Johnson was hired to replace Jones.

Recruiting class
References:

|}

Transfers
Outgoing

Incoming

Personnel

Schedule
Texas Tech and the Big 12 announced the 2023 football schedule on January 31, 2023.

Schedule Source:

Game summaries

at Wyoming

Oregon

Tarleton State

at West Virginia

Houston

at Baylor

Kansas State

at BYU

TCU

at Kansas

UCF

at Texas

Statistics
Scores against non-conference opponents

Scores against the Big 12

Scores against all opponents

References

Texas Tech
Texas Tech Red Raiders football seasons
2023 in sports in Texas